Felipe Maria Garin Ortiz de Taranco (February 14, 1908 – June 7, 2005) was a Spanish writer, researcher and Academician of art.

Biography

Born in Valencia on February 14, 1908. He was member of Real Academia de Bellas Artes de San Carlos de Valencia (Spain) in 1940, in this institution he exercised as president for more than two decades, the period 1974-1999. He died on June 7, 2005 in Valenciay.

Career

Because of its dual legal and historical formation, Felipe Garin could practice in both fields, but not equally. His interest in history began soon and most of his career he served as art historian. He was president of the Real Academia de Bellas Artes de San Carlos de Valencia (Spain) from 1974, and director of the journal “Archivo del Arte Valenciano” a referent in Valencian Art. He was honored referee of the College Doctors and Graduates in Philosophy and Letters and Sciences of the University of Valencia and was the head of Service Artistic Information, archaeological and ethnological of the university of Valencia. He was also president of the Provincial Commission of Monuments and Historical- Artistic elements of Valencia. He was also member of  Academy of Valencian Culture; Institute Alfonso El magnanimo, and promoted and defended Valencian Culture and language along his career. He was a corresponding member of the Royal Academic of History of Madrid, the Real Academia de Bellas Artes de San Fernando, the Real Academy of Fine Arts of San Jorge de Barcelona, the Real Academia de Bellas Artes de Santa Isabel de Hungría (Seville), the Royal Academy Hispanoamericana (Cadiz), the Velez Academy of Fine Arts at Ecija (Sevilla), and The Hispanic Society of America.

Among the many awards received include: the Gold Medal for Cultural Merit awarded by the Ministry of Culture, the Cross of the Order of Alfonso X, National Prize of Literature and Art Criticism, Spanish National Superior Research Council Award, Gold Medal of the "Circulo de Bellas Artes" in Valencia, Gold Medal of the University Politécnica of Valencia and Medal of the Faculty of Fine Arts in Valencia.

He received the High Distinction of the Generalitat Valenciana Cultural Merit in 1995. Also, it has a statue located in 1993 in the "Jardines de Viveros" a park close to the San Pio V Museum of Valence where he performed his activity and also names a street about his hometown Valencia. He was a candidate on several occasions "Prince of Asturias prize" in Fine Arts.

He published numerous books and artistic monographs, them, aspects of the Valencian Gothic architecture, Loa and elegy Palomino painter in decoration of Santos Juanes Church of Valencia, El libro de horas del conde-duque de Olivares and “La visión de España de Sorolla” among others.

He was married to Llombart Angeles Rodriguez, with they had two children; Mary Angels and Felipe. He was very rooted in social and cultural life of their neighborhood, the neighborhood of el Carmen, where discoursed all his life. His son Felipe Garin Llombart was director of the Museum Prado (1991-1993), director of the Academy of Spain in Rome and also director of the Museum of Fine Arts in Valencia between 1969 and 1990.
He died in Valencia on 7 June 2005 being buried in the General Cemetery of Valencia. Felipe Garin's library was donated by his wife and families to the Valencian National Library located at the monastery “Monasterio de San Miguel de los Reyes”.

References

Blasco Gil, Peset y Ferrer Sapena, 2014, p. 19.
Blasco Gil, Peset y Ferrer Sapena, 2014, p. 78.
«Felipe Garin Ortiz de Taranco, investigador y académico del arte». El País. EFE. 8 de junio de 2005. Consultado el 25 de agosto de 2016.
ALEJOS MORÁN, A. (2002). Introducción a una iconografía vicentina en Iglesias de la ciudad de Valencia.
Felipe, M. (1999). ª Garín Ortiz de Taranco. Trayectoria académica, social y científica.
Blasco Gil, Yolanda, Fernanda Peset Mancebo, and Antonia Ferrer Sapena. "Felipe María Garín Ortiz de Taranco. Trayectoria académica y social." (2013).
http://www.mcnbiografias.com/app-bio/do/show?key=garin-ortiz-de-taranco-felipe-maria

Bibliography

Blasco Gil, Yolanda; Peset, Fernanda; Ferrer Sapena, Antonia (2014). «Trayectoria académica y social». En Yolanda Ayala Gascón. Felipe María Garín Ortiz de Taranco: trayectoria académica, social y científica. Universitat Politècnica de València. pp. 17–128. .
FELIPE Mª GARIN ORTIZ DE TARANCO (2004). «MI SIGLO XX: MEMORIAS» Ed. UNIVERSIDAD POLITECNICA DE VALENCIA. SERVICIO DE PUBLICACION. .

References

1908 births
2005 deaths